This is the discography for Canadian rock band Loverboy.

Albums

Studio albums

Live albums

Compilations

Singles

Video albums

Music videos

References 

Discographies of Canadian artists
Rock music discographies